htop is an interactive system-monitor process-viewer and process-manager. It is designed as an alternative to the Unix program top.

It shows a frequently updated list of the processes running on a computer, normally ordered by the amount of CPU usage. Unlike top, htop provides a full list of processes running, instead of the top resource-consuming processes. htop uses color and gives visual information about processor, swap and memory status. htop can also display the processes as a tree.

Users often deploy htop in cases where Unix top does not provide enough information about the system's processes. htop is also popularly used interactively as a system monitor. Compared to top, it provides a more convenient, visual, cursor-controlled interface for sending signals to processes.

htop is written in the C programming language using the ncurses library. Its name is derived from the original author's first name, as a nod to pinfo, an info-replacement program that does the same.

Because system monitoring interfaces are not standardized among Unix-like operating systems, much of htop's code must be rewritten for each operating system. Cross-platform, OpenBSD, FreeBSD and Mac OS X, support was added in htop 2.0. Solaris/Illumos/OpenIndiana support added in 2.2.0.

htop was forked by several developers as htop-dev, and with support from the original author, the homepage was later redirected to a new domain.

See also

 top (software)
bmon, bandwidth monitoring

References

External links

 htop Homepage

Free software programmed in C
Software that uses ncurses
System monitors
Unix process- and task-management-related software